Vanalinn (Estonian for "Old Town") is a subdistrict in the district of Kesklinn (Midtown), Tallinn, the capital of Estonia. It has a population of 4,437.

Gallery

See also
Tallinn Old Town

References

Subdistricts of Tallinn
Kesklinn, Tallinn
Tallinn Old Town